The Dix Range is a range of mountains in the High Peaks region of the Adirondacks, southeast of Mount Marcy and the Ausable valley, in northeastern New York State. The Dixes are named for John Adams Dix, then Secretary of State under New York Governor William Marcy, later Senator, U.S. Secretary of the Treasury, and New York Governor. The only exception to this is the mountain formerly named East Dix, which in 2014 was renamed Grace Peak in honor of Grace Leach Hudowalski (1906–2004), who in 1937 became the ninth person and first woman to climb all 46 of the Adirondack High Peaks.

The range includes Hough Peak, and Macomb Mountain, Grace Peak, South Dix, and Dix Mountain, the sixth highest peak in the state.

See also 
 List of mountains in New York

References

External links
 Adirondack Journeys - Dix Range

Adirondack High Peaks
Landforms of Essex County, New York
Mountain ranges of New York (state)